The Abu Dhabi Vegetable Market (aka Al Mina Fruit & Vegetable Market or Souk) is the main vegetable market in central Abu Dhabi, United Arab Emirates.

As well as stalls selling fresh fruit and vegetables in general, the market also features a row of shops selling dates. The market is next to Zayed Port and the Fish Market is close by too.

References

External links
 Abu Dhabi Traditional Markets - Fruit & Vegetable Market | Mina video on YouTube

Year of establishment missing
Retail markets in the United Arab Emirates
Vegetable Market
Vegetable Market
Souqs
Food markets